The Halifax Regional Municipality (HRM) is a major generator of economic activity in Atlantic Canada.

Largest employers

Government and military
The largest employer in HRM is government, with most provincial government departments headquartered in the area, as well as many regional offices for federal government departments and agencies.

The Department of National Defence is the single largest employer and Halifax Harbour continues to serve a major military purpose as the Atlantic Ocean home port for the Royal Canadian Navy.  CFB Halifax is Canada's largest naval base and the nation's largest military base in number of personnel.  This base comprises various shore-based facilities including HMC Dockyard, Stadacona, CFAD Bedford, and other  adjunct facilities throughout HRM and central Nova Scotia.  Approximately 2/3 of the navy's major ships are home ported in Halifax.  Another major military facility is located at 12 Wing, CFB Shearwater in Eastern Passage.  This is the home base of naval aviation in Canada and is used as a heliport for the CH-148 Cyclone.

Port of Halifax

The largest influence on HRM's economy is its port and related spin-offs. Halifax is one of Canada's top four container ports in terms of the volume of cargo handled. Halifax Harbour is strategically located just north of the Great Circle Route between western Europe and the Eastern Seaboard of North America as the first inbound, last outbound major port of call on the continent with strategic rail connections to central and western Canada and the United States. The Halifax Port Authority operates two major container terminals, a medium-sized oil refinery, numerous general cargo piers and more specialized cargo handling piers for products such as automobiles and bulk gypsum.

Port facilities are also increasingly used for logistics support of offshore natural gas production platforms near Sable Island, and for ongoing oil and gas exploration. The port has a shipyard and the eastern side of the harbour is home to Canadian Coast Guard Base Dartmouth and the internationally renowned Bedford Institute of Oceanography.  In recent years, there has been an increase in number of cruise ships through a redeveloped passenger terminal at Pier 21.  The port is also the eastern terminus of the transcontinental Canadian National Railway which maintains extensive facilities around the waterfront.

The Halifax Shipyard is one of Canada's most well-equipped, having recently undergone a $300-million modernization to accommodate the building of new combat vessels for the Canadian navy.

Another deep water port is the Sheet Harbour Industrial Port, which mainly serves the offshore and forestry industry in eastern Nova Scotia.

Primary industries
Agriculture, fishing, mining, forestry and natural gas extraction are major resource industries found in the rural areas of HRM.

The main agriculture area of the Halifax Regional Municipality is the Musquodoboit Valley.  The total number of farms in HRM is 150, of which 110 are family-owned, and at the 2001 census there were 3,630 people working in agriculture and resource-based industries in the municipality, out of a total population of 359,111.

Fishing harbours are located along all coastal areas with some having an independent harbour authority, and others being managed by small craft harbours under the federal Department of Fisheries and Oceans.

Forestry is most common in the Musquodoboit Valley - Eastern Shore area where there are 21 sawmills.

Other resource industries in HRM include the natural gas fields off the coast of Sable Island, as well as clay, shale, gold, limestone, and gypsum extraction in rural areas of the city.

Secondary industries
HRM is a major regional manufacturing centre.

It is an exporter of beer, being home to the Keith's brewery and Oland Brewery as well as several local specialty beers produced in micro-breweries.  The aerospace industry has an increasing significance in the regional economy, through engine manufacturer Pratt and Whitney Canada, and IMP Aerospace, as well as the increasing passenger and cargo traffic at Halifax International Airport.

Tertiary industries
With the largest population centre in Atlantic Canada and a geographically central location in Nova Scotia, HRM has witnessed a transformation in its economy during recent decades with the growth of the service sector.  The historic home to the Bank of Nova Scotia (branch #1 is located there), the municipality has received an influx of banking and financial service-related employment in recent years.  Maritime Life is headquartered in the municipality and many call centres, computer and information technology firms are located in HRM. Halifax is also home to the three largest law firms in Atlantic Canada, McInnes Cooper, Stewart McKelvey, and Cox Palmer. 

Halifax also hosts a growing number of Commercial Buildings and Coworking spaces like Regus and The Office coworking space located at 600 Bedford Highway to serve the expanding business community.

Growth prospects
The economy of HRM has been relatively strong in the past decade. Growth in public sector employment at all levels of government that far exceeds demographic population growth nationally, coupled with wage and benefits packages that are at least 12% greater than comparative private sector jobs have provided HRM with sustained growth in population and economic activity in recent years. HRM has also benefited from a demographic shift of younger Atlantic Canadians from rural and small town communities to urban centres.

Another important ingredient in HRM's growth has been a major investment in offshore oil and gas exploration, resulting in many high-paying jobs locating to the area.  Halifax Harbour was also the staging site for much of the development of the Sable Offshore Energy natural gas project during the late 1990s, as well as somewhat smaller crude oil development projects during the 1970s-1990s.

Unemployment is relatively low (5.9% in July 2010) and is well below both the provincial and national averages.

Communications
HRM is also a major communication centre and gateway.

Private sector telecommunication companies Bell Aliant and Eastlink have extensive service in the municipality and offer wire telephone, Internet and television signals.

Rogers Wireless, Bell Canada, and Telus offer cellular telephone service in urban areas and along major transportation corridors.

The communities of Pennant Point, Herring Cove and Beaver Harbour are landing sites for fibre optic  Trans-Atlantic cables.

The communities of Harrietsfield and Pennant Point are home to earth stations.

Corporate headquarters

Air Canada Jazz, CanJet, and Maritime Air Charter are headquartered in Enfield and in the Halifax Regional Municipality.

Regional airline Air Nova, which became a part of Air Canada Jazz, was headquartered in Enfield.

References